Danyl Yuriyovych Mashchenko (born 30 September 2002) is a Ukrainian professional footballer who plays as a left-back for Ukrainian club Prykarpattia Ivano-Frankivsk.

References

External links
 Profile on Prykarpattia Ivano-Frankivsk official website
 
 

2002 births
Living people
People from Bucha, Kyiv Oblast
Ukrainian footballers
Association football defenders
FC Dynamo Kyiv players
FC Prykarpattia Ivano-Frankivsk (1998) players
Ukrainian First League players
Sportspeople from Kyiv Oblast